The Assam mole shrew (Anourosorex assamensis) is a species of red-toothed shrew endemic to northeast India.

References

Anourosorex
Endemic fauna of India
Mammals of India
Mammals described in 1875